Joseph Andrew McLean (born 30 November 1979) is a Scottish filmmaker. He has written, produced & directed commercials, documentaries, music videos and short films in the UK & USA.

Early life and education
McLean was born in Glasgow, Scotland, the son of Anne (née Wason), and Alistair McLean. He has three older siblings Lynn, Alyson and James.

He attended St. Peter's Primary in Partick and St. Thomas Aquinas Secondary School in Jordanhill.

Born on St. Andrew's Day, he is named after Scotland's Patron Saint.

He had a love of film from a young age and was an avid cinema goer, frequenting the local Grosvenor Cinema in Ashton Lane and the Salon Cinema in Hillhead.

In 2013 he graduated from the University of Glasgow with a Master of Arts (Scotland) in English Literature and Politics.

Joseph studied screenwriting at the University of California and University of Strathclyde.

Career
Joseph made a number of short films during his time at university in California and Glasgow.

His first feature film script Utopia, a docudrama loosely based on the events surrounding Jim Jones, the founder and leader of the Peoples Temple, best known for the mass murder-suicide in November 1978 of 909 of its members in Jonestown, Guyana was voted runner-up at the 20th Anniversary University of California, Irvine Screenwriting Festival in 2012.

After leaving university, McLean founded his own production company Partickular Films which specialises in commercials, documentaries, films and music videos.

In 2013, he released the short film Sectarian Secret Police about a Partick Thistle supporter who is kidnaped by a special police unit who demand he disowns his favourite football team in favour of Rangers or Celtic. Thomas Simpson of Movie Scramble wrote 'As a comical approach to a serious subject it does evoke the required laughs.' The film screened at numerous film festivals throughout the UK, including Screentest: The National Student Film Festival in London and the Loch Ness film festival.

In the same year he also directed the music video Nothing on Earth for the band Casual Sex, the music video was showcased by SXSW and featured in The Daily Record and The Skinny.

In 2014, McLean wrote a pilot for a TV series called 2014 which revolved around the organisers for the 2014 Commonwealth Games.

He was commissioned to write a script for an animated film as part of Deep Roots, Kilmarnock's major Homecoming Scotland event in 2014, charting the history of Dean Castle and the Boyd Family, who were lords of Kilmarnock for over 400 years. The 10-minute animation was screened onto the side of the castle to an audience of over 1400 local school children.

His short film Nomad about the Scottish Independence Referendum was inspired by a scene from The Parallax View starring Warren Beatty. The film was screened at the Shorts on Tap Beyond Scotland event at 93 Feet East, Brick Lane, London.

He is a member of BAFTA Scotland.

Filmography

Film

Television

References

External links

Joseph Andrew McLean Website
Partickular Films

Living people
Scottish film directors
Scottish screenwriters
1979 births
Alumni of the University of Glasgow
People educated at St Thomas Aquinas Secondary School, Glasgow
Film people from Glasgow